The Mamba North gas field is a natural gas field located offshore the Cabo Delgado Province in Mozambique. It was discovered in 2012 and developed by and Eni. It began production in 2012 and produces natural gas and condensates. The total proven reserves of the Mamba North gas field are around 15 trillion cubic feet (429 km³), and production is slated to be around 140 million cubic feet/day (4×105m³).

References

Natural gas fields in Mozambique